A staircase tower or stair tower (also Stiegenturm or Wendelstein) is a tower-like wing of a building with a circular or polygonal plan that contains a stairwell, usually a helical staircase.

History 
Only a few examples of staircase towers have survived from ancient times (e.g. on the Imperial Baths in Trier); staircases were often superfluous on the only single-storey buildings or were built into the outer walls of buildings that were often several feet thick. This tradition continued in the keeps (donjons), churches and castles of the early and high Middle Ages; and this situation only changed with the increasing construction of purpose-built and generally rather undecorated staircase towers of the High and Late Middle Ages (Romanesque and Gothic architecture styles).

Since the Renaissance period, staircase towers were markedly more decorative and representative of status. Stairs were now rarely hidden or built externally, but there were both artistically designed, curved and straight-running staircases inside the building with ornate ceilings and railings (e. g. Château de Chambord, Palazzo Barberini and Château d'Azay-le-Rideau or Château de Chenonceau). With the increasing construction of straight staircases with intermediate landings (the modern stairwells) separate staircase towers became gradually rarer.

Examples 

France
 Former abbey church of Saint-Menoux
 Château de Blois, Loire region
 Château de Chambord, Loire region
 Château de Tanlay, département of Yonne

Germany
 Albrechtsburg, Meißen
 Lutherhaus, Wittenberg
 Latscha Building, Frankfurt-Ostend, Hesse
 Dresden Castle, Dresden
 Bertholdsburg Castle, Schleusingen, Thuringia
 Hartenfels Palace, Torgau
 Schloss Johannisburg, Aschaffenburg, Franconia
 Schloss Köthen (Anhalt)
 Weitersroda Castle, Hildburghausen, Thuringia
 Wilhelmsburg Castle, Schmalkalden, Thuringia

Ireland
Reeves Castle, County Kildare

See also 
 Traboule, a special type of staircase tower

References

Further reading 
 Hans Koepf, Günther Binding: Bildwörterbuch der Architektur. Kröner, Stuttgart, 2001,

External links 
 

Stairs
Stairways
Towers
Rooms
Architectural elements
Architectural terminology